Eichgraben-Altlengbach is a railway station serving Eichgraben in Lower Austria.

References 

Railway stations in Lower Austria
Austrian Federal Railways